Lamprosema polysemalis is a moth in the family Crambidae. It was described by George Hampson in 1897. It is found on the Loyalty Islands in the south-west Pacific Ocean.

References

Moths described in 1897
Lamprosema
Moths of Oceania